Nicasio Álvarez de Sotomayor (1900–1936) was a Spanish falangist politician and member of the Confederación Nacional del Trabajo (CNT). He was alcalde of the Province of Cáceres in Extremadura under the Second Spanish Republic. After the outbreak of the Spanish Civil War, he was executed by the Nationalists in the White Terror (Spain).

References

Bibliography
 
 

1900 births
1936 deaths
Confederación Nacional del Trabajo members
Spanish Falangists
Spanish Civil War in Extremadura
Alcaldes of the Province of Cáceres
Alcaldes of the Second Spanish Republic
Victims of the White Terror (Spain)
Executed anarchists